House of the Living Dead (Skaduwees Oor Brugplaas, or Shadows over Bridge Farm), also known as Doctor Maniac, is a 1974 science-fiction horror film directed by Ray Austin. The film, an international co-production between Great Britain and South Africa, takes place on a plantation in South Africa and deals heavily with the occult.

Plot
The storyline follows a white family running a plantation farm on the Cape Colony in South Africa. The family consists of a mother (Margaret Inglis) and her two sons, Michael and Breck (both played by Mark Burns). Michael runs the house while Breck spends his time alone in his room, deformed and insane, conducting experiments to try to prove the soul is an organic object able to live outside the human body. Michael's fiancée Mary (Shirley Anne Field) arrives to marry him, much to the mother's dismay as she wants the family to end so the long history of madness can stop. Meanwhile, strange things begin to happen at the plantation, such as voodoo, which is assumed to be the work of the local black neighbors, and murder.

Awards
Mark Burns was recognized as Best Actor at the 1974 Sitges Film Festival.

Content
The film contains very little gore and no zombies at all, as would generally be expected of a title containing "Living Dead". It is sometimes confused with the substantially more popular video game series House of the Dead. It is 86 minutes long (85 in the UK cut version) and is rated Australia: R (and UK PG). It goes under various names – Doctor Maniac in the UK and US, Curse of the Dead also in the US, and Kill, Baby, Kill when released to video.

Cast
Mark Burns   ...  Sir Michael Brattling / Dr. Breckinridge Brattling  
Shirley Anne Field   ...  Mary Anne Carew 
David Oxley   ...  Dr. Collinson 
Margaret Inglis   ... Lady Brattling 
Dia Sydow  ...  Lina 
Lynn Maree  ...  Annie 
Bill Flynn   ... Simeon 
William Baird Clark   ...  Capt. Turner 
 Ronald France   ...  Col. Pringle 
 Don Furnival   ...  Brand 
Pieter Geldenhuys   ...  Shoemaker
 Ben Dekker   ...  Jan 
Limpie Basson   ...  Hugo de Groot 
Amina Gool   ...  Aia Kat

See also
 Night of the Living Dead

External links
 House of The Living Dead at RottenTomatoes.com
 
 House of The Living Dead at AllMovie.com

1974 films
1974 horror films
British science fiction horror films
1970s science fiction horror films
Films set on farms
Films set in South Africa
Films shot in South Africa
1970s English-language films
Films directed by Ray Austin
1970s British films